Thomas Daly (February 21, 1861 – November 17, 1908) was a politician in Alberta, Canada and a municipal councillor in Edmonton.

Biography
Daly was born in Letterbreen, Ireland and immigrated to Canada in 1881.  He spent two years in Manitoba and moved to Alberta in 1883 to homestead at Clover Bar.  He exhibited his oats at the 1893 Chicago World's Fair and won first prize; he is sometimes credited with establishing Alberta's reputation as an oats producer.  He later turned to apple farming.  In 1894 he married Jessie Gray.

In the 1906 Edmonton election, Daly ran for Edmonton City Council as an alderman.  He finished second of twelve candidates and was elected to a two-year term, but resigned less than a year into his term.

Thomas Daly died November 17, 1908.  Daly Grove, an Edmonton neighbourhood, is named in his honour.

References
Edmonton Public Library biography of Thomas Daly
City of Edmonton biography of Thomas Daly
Report to the Edmonton City Council Executive Committee including a list of aldermen who have been honoured in the names of Edmonton's features
Industry in Strathcona County

1861 births
1908 deaths
Canadian farmers
Edmonton city councillors
Irish emigrants to Canada (before 1923)
People from County Fermanagh